Ben Bowman is an American film director and screenwriter. He made his feature debut with the drama Knucklehead.  The film premiered as the opening night film at the 2015 BAMcinématek New Voices in Black Cinema Festival. It went on to win awards at film festivals across the U.S. and earned positive reviews. A North American release was scheduled for October 2016.

Career
Bowman began his career in Minneapolis, where he grew up, editing music video footage for Prince. He later studied directing under Spike Lee at New York University.

Novelist Jonathan Lethem's "The Mad Brooklynite" was adapted for the stage by Bowman, who also directed the original production at The 45th Street Theater in New York City.

Bowman’s debut as a feature writer and director was the Brooklyn set independent drama Knucklehead. Together with Bryan Abrams, he wrote the screenplay, which went on to draw the attention of Emmy winning and Oscar nominated actor Alfre Woodard. She had received the script from her co-star Gbenga Akinnagbe, who was also a producer on the film. Woodard said that after reading the script, she signed on immediately to work with Bowman, “a young filmmaker with a great idea."

Filmography

References

External links

Living people
English-language film directors
New York University alumni
Writers from Minneapolis
Artists from Minneapolis
Film directors from Minnesota
Year of birth missing (living people)